This is a list of National Hockey League players who have signed offer sheets.

In the NHL, players who are restricted free agents can be, after being qualified by their current team, signed by another team to an offer sheet with salary greater than the qualifying offer. Teams have seven days to match the offer, and if the offer is not matched, the team making the offer sheet must give up compensation (see here for details). Currently to be tendered an offer sheet, a player must:

Have at least one NHL contract expire.
Have played at least 80 NHL games if a forward or defenseman, or 28 NHL games if a goalie (applies only for players who have 3 years of NHL service).
Be younger than 27 on July 1 of that year.
Be without a contract for the upcoming season.
Be tendered a qualifying offer by the current team by June 25 or the Monday after that year's NHL Entry Draft (whichever is later)

If any of those conditions has not been met, the player becomes an "unrestricted free agent" and cannot receive an offer sheet.

1988-1994 Restricted free agent classification

The 1988-1994 NHL collective bargaining agreement (CBA) introduced restricted free agency and operated under different rules than subsequent CBAs.  Unrestricted free agency would not be introduced until the 1995 CBA.  The 1988-1994 NHL CBA had four groups of restricted free agents who were eligible to sign an offer sheet.  Since 1995, Group II restricted free agency was the lone carryover with adjusted age and experience criteria.

Signed offer sheets

Related transactions
In August 1994, the Hartford Whalers reportedly wished to sign Glen Wesley to an offer sheet, however they already had an outstanding offer for Steven Rice at the time. Instead, Wesley was signed by the Boston Bruins and immediately traded for three 1st round draft picks in the 1995, 1996, and 1997 drafts.  The contract was reported to be $1.7 million per season for 3 seasons.

References

National Hockey League labor relations
Lists of National Hockey League players